This is a list of countries by mined copper production. 

Copper ore can be exported to be smelted so that a nation's smelter production of copper can differ greatly from its mined production. See: List of countries by copper smelter production.

2020

2017

2015

2012

1907

See also
List of copper mines
List of copper production by company

References

Further reading
 http://minerals.usgs.gov/minerals/pubs/mcs/

Lists of countries by mineral production
Production by country